Closer to Heaven (lit. "My Love by My Side") is a 2009 South Korean film written and directed by Park Jin-pyo, starring Ha Ji-won and Kim Myung-min.

Plot
Lee Ji-soo is a twice-divorced funeral director, and no stranger to death or loss. She reunites with old friend Baek Jong-woo when he arranges for funeral services for his deceased mother. Jong-woo has been battling Lou Gehrig's disease since he was a teenager. The two fall in love and get married. As Jong-woo's symptoms continue to worsen and he begins to lose control over his body, he lashes out at Ji-soo. Despite her hurt, all Ji-soo wants is to stay by his side and hope for a cure.

Cast 
 Ha Ji-won as Lee Ji-soo
 Kim Myung-min as Baek Jong-woo
 Nam Neung-mi as Joo Ok-yeon 
 Im Ha-ryong as Park Geun-sook, Choon-ja's husband
 Choi Jong-ryeol as Ok-yeon's husband
 Shin Shin-ae as Jin Hee Mo (Jin-hee's mother)
 Im Jong-yoon as Bae Seok-joong
 Im Hyung-joon as Bae Seok-won
 Im Seong-min as Choon-ja
 Son Ga-in as Seo Jin-hee
 Jang Won-young as Mr. Choi
 Hong Seok-yoo as Elder Son
 Kim Yeo-jin as Professor Son Young-chan 
 Kim Kwang-kyu as Kook Dong-sik 
 Jung Eui-chul as Yoo Seung-wook 
 Son Young-soon as Jong-woo's mother 
 Yoo Seung-mok as Ex-husband Kim Eun-ho 
 Kim Young-pil as Jong-woo's friend, Wook-joong 
 Kim Young-hoon as Jong-woo's friend, Kwan-young 
 Choi Yo-han as Jong-woo's friend, Jae-ho 
 Jeon Su-ji as Kim Jong-do's wife
 Yoo Ji-yeon as Head nurse
 Kang Shin-il as Lee Hak-cheon, Ji-soo's father (cameo)
 Sol Kyung-gu as Kim Jong-do (cameo)
 Song Young-chang as Therapist (cameo)
 Seo Hyo-rim as Reporter (cameo)

Release 
Closer to Heaven was released in South Korean theaters on 24 September 2009, and it topped the box office chart for 3 consecutive weeks. It was the first melodrama to surpass the 2 million admissions mark since Maundy Thursday in 2006. Closer to Heaven received a total of 2,153,068 admissions at the end of its run, making it the 10th highest grossing film of 2009.

Awards and nominations

References

External links 
  
 
 
 

2009 films
2009 romantic drama films
Films directed by Park Jin-pyo
2000s Korean-language films
South Korean romantic drama films
2000s South Korean films